BNP Paribas is a French international banking group, founded in 2000 from the merger between Banque Nationale de Paris (BNP, "National Bank of Paris") and Paribas, formerly known as the Banque de Paris et des Pays-Bas. The full name of the group's parent entity is BNP Paribas S.A.

With 190,000 employees as of February 2021, the bank is organized into three major business areas: Commercial, Personal Banking & Services (CPBS), Investment & Protection Services (IPS) and Corporate & Institutional Banking (CIB).

The group is listed on the first market of Euronext Paris and a component of the Euro Stoxx 50 stock market index, while it also included in the French CAC 40 index.

BNP Paribas is the second largest banking group in Europe, after HSBC, and ninth largest banking group in the world, essentially a bulge bracket. It became one of the five largest banks in the world following the 2008 financial crisis. Despite some legal difficulties in 2014, including being fined the largest ever sum as reparation for violating U.S. sanctions, it remains one of the ten largest banks worldwide. It is considered a systemically important bank by the Financial Stability Board.

History 

BNP Paribas results from a series of French and international mergers. Particularly notable were the merger of Comptoir national d'escompte de Paris and Banque nationale pour le commerce et l'industrie that formed BNP in 1966, and the latter's merger with Paribas in 1999–2000. Other significant recent transactions involved the acquisitions by BNP Paribas in 2006 of Banca Nazionale del Lavoro in Italy, and in 2008 of Fortis in Belgium and the Netherlands.

Banque Nationale de Paris (BNP)

On 7 March 1848, the French Provisional Government founded the Comptoir national d'escompte de Paris (CNEP) in response to the financial shock caused by the revolution of February 1848. The CNEP soon developed the largest international network of any French bank.

BNCI resulted from the combination over time of a number of pre-existing banks: the Banque franco-égyptienne (est. 1870), which in 1889 became the Banque internationale de Paris; the Banque française d'Afrique du Sud (est. 1895); and the Banque Nationale de Crédit (est. 1912).

After the end of the Second World War, the French state decided to "put banks and credit to work for national reconstruction". René Pleven, then Minister of Finance, launched a massive reorganization of the banking industry. A law passed on 2 December 1945 and which went into effect on 1 January 1946 nationalized the four leading French retail banks: Banque nationale pour le commerce et l'industrie (BNCI), Comptoir national d'escompte de Paris (CNEP), Crédit Lyonnais, and Société Générale.

In 1966, the French government decided to merge Comptoir national d'escompte de Paris with Banque nationale pour le commerce et l'industrie to create one new bank called Banque Nationale de Paris (BNP).

The bank was re-privatised in 1993 under the leadership of Michel Pébereau as part of a second Chirac government's privatization policy.

Banque de Paris et des Pays-Bas (known from 1982 as Paribas)

Banque de Paris et des Pays-Bas (Paribas) was established on 27 January 1872, through the merger of Banque de Crédit et de Dépôt des Pays-Bas, whose origins go back to the bank established in 1820 by Louis-Raphaël Bischoffsheim (1800–1873) in Amsterdam, and Banque de Paris, which had been founded in 1869 by a group of Parisian bankers. It went on to develop a strong investment banking business both domestically in France and overseas.

During the period 1872 to 1913, it was involved in raising funds for the French and other governments as well as big businesses through a number of bond issues. It helped the French government raise funds during the First World War and raised further capital and expanded into investments into industrial companies during the Great Depression. It stagnated and lost assets during the Second World War.

After World War II, it escaped the nationalisation of other French banks due to its status as an investment bank and managed to take advantage of that by expanding its operations overseas. It also directs its activity towards businesses and participates in the development and restructuring of French industry, including names such as Groupe Bull and Thomson-CSF.

The bank was nationalized in 1982 by the government of Pierre Mauroy under François Mitterrand as part of a law that nationalized five major industrial companies, thirty-nine registered banks, and two financial companies, Suez and Paribas. It was re-privatized in January 1987 by the Chirac government.

In the 1990s, Paribas had an active policy of acquisitions and divestiture.  This included selling the Ottoman Bank to Doğuş Holding, and setting up the joint venture lending company Cetelem in Germany. It sold Crédit du Nord to Société Générale and in 1998 it merged with Compagnie Bancaire, renaming the bank with the official name Compagnie Financière de Paribas.

Founding of BNP Paribas

In 1999, BNP and Société Générale fought a complex battle on the stock market, with Société Générale bidding for Paribas and BNP bidding for Société Générale and counter-bidding for Paribas. BNP's bid for Société Générale failed, while its bid for Paribas succeeded leading to a merger of BNP and Paribas one year later on 23 May 2000.

In 2006, BNP Paribas purchased Banca Nazionale del Lavoro (BNL), Italy's sixth largest bank.

On 9 August 2007, BNP Paribas became the first major financial group to acknowledge the impact of the sub-prime crisis by closing two funds exposed to it.  This day is now generally seen as the start of the credit crisis and the bank's quick reaction saved it from the fate of other large European banks such as UBS.

On 6 October 2008, BNP took over 75% of troubled bank Fortis' activities in Belgium, and 66% in Luxembourg, in exchange for the Belgian government becoming the new group's major shareholder. The sales of the Fortis shares was suspended by a court order from the Court of Appeal on Friday 12 December

On 14 December 2008, BNP announced it could lose €350 million as a victim of the Madoff fraud.

In the end of January, the Belgian government and BNP negotiated for a 75% partnership in Fortis Bank Belgium. Fortis Insurance Belgium would be reintegrated in Fortis Holding.

On 11 February, Fortis' shareholders decided that Fortis Bank Belgium and Fortis Insurance Belgium should not become property of BNP Paribas. However the acquisition was completed and BNP Paribas took 75% share holding and renamed the new subsidiary BNP Paribas Fortis.  After this only Fortis Insurance International was left in Fortis Holding and this was renamed as Ageas, a business that had Insurance all over Europe and Asia.  The remaining Fortis Bank Netherlands was in the hands of the Dutch Government which merged it with other ABN AMRO holdings it already owned under the name ABN AMRO.

In May 2009, BNP Paribas became the majority shareholder (65.96%) of BGL (formerly Fortis Bank Luxembourg), the State of Luxembourg retaining 34% making BNP the eurozone's largest bank by deposits held.

On 21 September, the bank's registered name was changed to BGL BNP Paribas and in February 2010, BGL BNP Paribas became the 100% owner of BNP Paribas Luxembourg. The transfer was finalised on 1 October 2010 with the incorporation of BNP Paribas Luxembourg's business in the operational platforms of BGL BNP Paribas. In 2013 BNP Paribas was awarded the Bank of the Year award by The International Financing Review ("IFR"), Thomson Reuters' leading financial industry publication. The IFR awards are a key industry benchmark and Bank of the Year is the top honour awarded.

BNP Paribas reached an agreement in December 2013 to acquire Rabobank's Polish unit BGZ Bank for around $1.4 billion. In September 2014, BNP completed the purchase of BGZ Bank for a final fee stated in the media to be $1.3 billion.

In June 2014, BNP Paribas pleaded guilty to falsifying business records and conspiracy, having violated U.S. sanctions against Cuba, Iran, and Sudan. It agreed to pay an $8.9 billion fine, the largest ever for violating U.S. sanctions at that time.

In December 2021, BNP Paribas announced to exit US retail banking business by selling its Bank of the West to the Bank of Montreal for $16.3bn.

Financial data 
In 2021, total revenues of €46.2 billion represent an increase of 4.4% compared to 2020, BNP Paribas remains at the top of the French banks' ranking in terms of activity. During this year, BNP Paribas Group net income attributable to equity holders increased to 34.3% (to 9.5 billion euros).

The geographic breakdown of Net Banking Income (NBI) at the end of 2020 is as follows: Europe (72.2%), North America (12.9%), Asia Pacific (8.6%) and others (6.3%).

Corporate identity 

The BNP Paribas logo since 2000 (designed by Laurent Vincent under the leadership of the Communications Director, Antoine Sire) is called the "courbe d'envol" (curve of taking flight). The stars allude to Europe and universality. The transformation of the stars into birds conveys openness, freedom, growth, and the ability to change and adapt. The shape and movement of the curve places the logo in the universe of life. The green square symbolises nature and optimism.

Corporate structure

Executive Committee 
The General Management and the executive committee are composed as follows:
 Jean-Laurent Bonnafé, Director and chief executive officer of BNP Paribas
 Yann Gérardin, directeur général délégué, Chief Operating Officer, Corporate & Institutional Banking
 Thierry Laborde, directeur général Délégué, Chief Operating Officer, Retail Banking
 Laurent David, Deputy Chief Operating Officer
 Renaud Dumora, Deputy Chief Operating Officer, Investment & Protection Services
 Marguerite Bérard, Head of French Retail Banking
 Stefaan Decraene, Head of International Retail Banking
 Charlotte Dennery, Director and chief executive officer of BNP Paribas Personal Finance
 Bernard Gavgani, Chief Information Officer
 Elena Goitini, chief executive officer of BNL
 Nathalie Hartmann, Head of Compliance
 Max Jadot, CEO and chairman of the executive board of BNP Paribas Fortis.
 Yannick Jung, Head of Corporate & Institutional Banking Global Banking EMEA
 Pauline Leclerc-Glorieux, Director and chief executive officer of BNP Paribas Cardif
 Lars Machenil, Chief Financial Officer
 Sofia Merlo, Head of Human Resources
 Olivier Osty, Head of Corporate & Institutional Banking Global Markets
 Franck Roncey, Chief Risk Officer
 Antoine Sire, Head of Company Engagement

Board of directors
As of 17 May 2021:
 Jean Lemierre (chairman), former president of the European Bank for Reconstruction and Development
 Jean-Laurent Bonnafé, CEO of BNP Paribas
 Jacques Aschenbroich, chairman and CEO of Valeo
 Pierre-André de Chalendar, chairman and CEO of Saint-Gobain
 Monique Cohen, partner at Apax Partners
 Wouter De Ploey, CEO of ZNA
 Hugues Epaillard, BNP Paribas Real Estate executive
 Rajna Gibson Brandon, professor at the University of Geneva
 Marion Guillou, global food security academic
 Denis Kessler, chairman and CEO of SCOR SE
 Daniela Schwarzer, director at the German Council on Foreign Relations
 Michel Tilmant, former CEO of ING
 Sandrine Verrier, economic advisor
 Jane Fields Wicker-Miurin, former Prudential plc executive
Other Corporate Officers
 Yann Gérardin, Chief Operating Officer of BNP Paribas in charge of CIB
 Thierry Laborde, Chief Operating Officer of BNP Paribas in charge of Commercial, Personal Banking & Services

Major shareholders June 2021
 Belgian State (through SFPI) (7.7%)
 Blackrock Inc. (6.0%)
 Grand Duchy of Luxembourg (1.0%)
 Employees (4.3%)
 Retail shareholders (4.2%)
 European institutional investors (43.4%)
 Non-European institutional investors (31.4%)
 Other and unidentified (2.0%)

Main subsidiaries

Retail banking 

 BNP Paribas France (more than 2 200 branches)
 BNP Paribas Bulgaria
 BancWest (Bank of the West in the USA)
 BNP Paribas El Djazaïr (Algeria)
 BMCI (Morocco)
 Banca Nazionale del Lavoro (BNL) (Italy)
 Turk Ekonomi Bankasi (TEB) (Turkey)
 BNP Paribas Fortis (Belgium, Germany, Poland, Turkey)
 BGL BNP Paribas (Luxembourg)
 Hello bank!
 Sahara Bank (Libya)
 Ukrsibbank (Ukraine)
 BCI Mer Rouge Djibouti
 Banque de Wallis et Futuna
 Banque Internationale pour le Commerce et l'Industrie du Sénégal (Senegal)
 Bank BGŻ BNP Paribas (Poland)
 Findomestic (Serbia)
 BNP PARIBAS Jordan (Jordan)

Other subsidiaries 
 Alfred Berg
 BNP Paribas Arbitrage
 BNP Paribas Assurances with Cardif, Pinnacle
 BNP Paribas Investment Partners
 BNP Paribas Partners for Innovation
 BNP Paribas Personal Finance UK (Creation Financial Services Limited and Creation Consumer Finance Limited)
 BNP Paribas Primebrokerag
 BNP Paribas Real Estate (formerly Atisreal)
 BNP Paribas Leasing Solutions with Arval, car leasing and Artegy
 BNP Paribas Securities Services
 BNP Paribas Wealth Management
 Cetelem
 Consors Finanz
 CortalConsors
 FundQuest
 SBI Life Insurance Company Limited a joint venture insurance company with State Bank of India, India's largest financial service company, owned by the Government of India
 Sharekhan, an Indian retail brokerage firm
 
 BNP Paribas Personal Investors Luxembourg
 Protection 24
 SAIB-BNP Paribas Asset Management

Controversies

Antisemitic allegations
In 2016 BNP reached a $40m settlement with a Jewish employee. The employee had been made to watch a training video. The film portrayed Adolf Hitler as the CEO of Deutsche Bank, one of BNP's competitors and the Nazi soldiers around him as Deutsche Bank executives. The video showed Hitler screaming at the soldiers. Also, his colleagues made a number of anti-semitic comments during his time at BNP Paribas.

Business with sanctioned countries
On 30 May 2014, The Wall Street Journal reported that the United States Department of Justice was negotiating a possible guilty plea with BNP Paribas as well as the size of the resulting fine for violating U.S. regulations and evading US sanctions. The Justice Department sought a fine of more than US $10 billion, which was expected to be reduced to $8 or $9 billion in negotiations. BNP Paribas was said to have laundered up to US$100 billion from the sanctioned countries of Sudan, Iran, and Cuba.

On 1 July 2014, BNP Paribas pled guilty in a New York state court to falsifying business records as well as conspiracy in connection to those falsifications. It was also expected to plead guilty in federal court to violating laws against money-laundering. It agreed to pay $8.9 billion, the largest fine ever for violating U.S. sanctions, and substantially more than the previous record of $1.9 billion. BNP Paribas was also barred for one year under the plea agreement from certain US dollar-dominated transactions. The fine exceeded the bank's $6.4 billion 2013 annual income and the $1.1 billion it previously had allocated for the anticipated fine.

The bank's failure to cooperate with the multi-year investigation was given as a significant factor in the size of the fine.  Additionally, BNP Paribas continued to process sanctioned transactions after the investigation began. About 30 employees left the bank as a result of the investigation. According to the FBI's New York Field Office and Chief Richard Weber of the Internal Revenue Service-Criminal Investigation (IRS-CI) "BNPP deliberately disregarded the law and provided rogue nations, and Sudan in particular, with vital access to the global financial system, helping that country's lawless government to harbor and support terrorists and to persecute its own people. Today's sentence demonstrates that financial institutions will be punished severely but appropriately for violating sanctions laws and risking our national security interests."

After the fine was announced, BNP said it would be "just fine" and that it had "a comprehensive plan" to avoid similar violations in the future. The company's stock, which had fallen 12% since news of the investigation first leaked, rose 4% on the announcement. To comply with the transaction ban, BNP Paribas will use a third party to clear its US transactions. Standard & Poor's said it was reviewing the bank's financial standing in light of the fine and penalties for a possible downgrade.

Russian president Vladimir Putin alleged that the US government was using the case to punish France for selling Mistral amphibious assault ships to Russia. He said the large fine and the imposition of sanctions on the French bank were the result of US displeasure with France's decision not to stop the sale. Former European Central Bank president Jean-Claude Trichet had previously said that a large fine was neither fair nor proportionate to the violations and could disrupt the global banking system.

Check processing
In 2010 the French government's Autorité de la concurrence fined BNP and 10 other banks €384 million for colluding to charge unjustified fees on check processing, including extra fees during the transition from paper check transfer to "Exchanges Check-Image" electronic transfer.
On 19 January 2011 BNP sued Russian grain trader, OOO Rosinteragroservis, and its subsidiary OAO Kubankhlebprodukt, claiming US$20 million in debts and penalties.

Discrimination 
In January 2022, a female banker was awarded £2M after the UK employment tribunal concluded that she had endured years of direct sex discrimination and victimisation. Her complaints include harassment and being paid thousands of pounds less than male colleagues in the same role.

Financing private prisons 
In 2017, ICCR  and the Families Belong Together Coalition began confronting banks about the human rights risks which accompany sponsoring the private prison industry. In 2019, BNP Paribas and other banks disengaged from the private prison industry.

€152 million risk management affair
The German Frankfurter Allgemeine Zeitung FOCUS, Bloomberg and the French Les Échos newspapers published an article regarding a €152 million mistrade (erroneous trade) in which BNP Paribas Arbitrage was allegedly involved. The bank has sold securities for €326,400 to the investor Armin S. but the value of the securities is €163 million according to the bank.

According to the article, the error remained unnoticed for several days. BNP has even reconfirmed the original price. However, a trade-cancellation was only possible until the next day according to prevailing erroneous trade rules.

Michael Lusk published an article regarding this case with the title "Do banks' internal control system work?"

A solicitor for Armin S., Mario Bögelein, stated in the article that a bank not recognizing an error of this magnitude should not be protected by law.

The Financial Times published an article in March 2018 about the case with the title "BNP Paribas failed to book trades in Germany for a week". It cites internal documents that show it did not book all trades that happened in structured products in Germany from 2 to 9 December 2015. The Financial Times estimates that 8,500 trades might have been affected. It also questions if the bank has hedged their positions if the trades have not been booked. Armin S. is cited with the words "I don't think it's fair if on the one hand, BNP wants to rely on statutory safeguard clauses but on the other hand they ignored all control-tasks imposed by the regulators – ECB, BaFin and AMF – for a whole week". ArminS vs BNP Paribas - 152m EUR risk management affair

Armin S also filed a claim for €152 million in Paris because the relevant jurisdiction is still unknown.

Sponsorship
BNP Paribas has been a major sponsor of tennis. In 1973 it became the major sponsor of the French Open, one of the four prestigious Grand Slam tournaments in the sport. In 2001 the bank began to sponsor the Davis Cup before becoming the title sponsor in 2002. In 2002 it became the sponsor of the Paris Masters, an ATP World Tour Masters 1000 tournament. In 2008 it became the sponsor of the BNP Paribas Primrose Bordeaux, an ATP Challenger Tour tournament. The company's sponsorship expanded to the United States in 2009 when it became the title sponsor of the Indian Wells Masters, an ATP World Tour Masters 1000 two-week tournament in California. It also sponsored the BNP Paribas Showdown and BNP Paribas Tennis Classic exhibition tournaments held in New York City and London respectively. The Stanford Classic, since 1992, is instead directly sponsored by the Bank of the West subsidiary.

See also

 Angolagate
 BNL BNP Paribas headquarters
 Cortal Consors
 European Financial Services Roundtable
 List of banks
 List of French companies
 List of investment banks
 List of investors in Bernard L. Madoff Securities
 Primary dealers

References

External links

 
 List of branches and ATMs of BNP Paribas in France (with addresses, contacts and agencies opening hours)
 Source d'Histoire, the website of the Archives and History department in BNP Paribas

 
Financial services companies established in 2000
Banks established in 2000
Banks based in Paris
Banks under direct supervision of the European Central Bank
Companies listed on Euronext Paris
CAC 40
Companies formerly listed on the Tokyo Stock Exchange
Companies in the Euro Stoxx 50
French brands
French companies established in 2000
Investment banks
Investment management companies of France
Multinational companies headquartered in France
Primary dealers
Systemically important financial institutions